Barbour Brook is a river in Delaware County, New York. It flows into Dry Brook northeast of Stilesville.

References

Rivers of New York (state)
Rivers of Delaware County, New York